Below is a list of notable footballers who have played for JS Kabylie. Generally, this means players that have played 100 or more league matches for the club. However, some players who have played fewer matches are also included; this includes players that have had considerable success either at other clubs or at international level, as well as players who are well remembered by the supporters for particular reasons.

Players are listed in alphabetical order according to the date of their first-team official debut for the club. Appearances and goals are for first-team competitive matches only. Substitute appearances included. Statistics accurate as of 14 March 2020.

List of JS Kabylie players

Nationalities are indicated by the corresponding FIFA country code.

List of All-time appearances
This List of All-time appearances for JS Kabylie contains football players who have played for JS Kabylie and have managed to accrue 100 or more appearances.

Bold Still playing competitive football in JS Kabylie.

Players from JS Kabylie to Europe

Award winners
(Whilst playing for JS Kabylie)

Algerian Footballer of the Year
  Moussa Saib – 2004

Top goalscorers in Algerian Ligue 1
  Mourad Derridj (14 goals) – 1972–73
  Mokrane Baïlèche (20 goals) – 1976–77
  Nacer Bouiche (17 goals) – 1983–84
  Nacer Bouiche (36 goals) – 1985–86
  Tarek Hadj Adlane (18 goals) – 1993–94
  Tarek Hadj Adlane (23 goals) – 1994–95
  Farid Ghazi (19 goals) – 1998–99
  Hamid Berguiga (18 goals) – 2004–05
  Hamid Berguiga (18 goals) – 2005–06
  Cheick Oumar Dabo (17 goals) – 2006–07
  Nabil Hemani (16 goals) – 2007–08
  Albert Ebossé Bodjongo (17 goals) – 2013–14

Algerian professional football awards Footballer of the Year
  Mohamed Rabie Meftah – 2008–09

Algerian professional football awards Goalkeeper of the Year
  Faouzi Chaouchi – 2008–09

Notes

References

Players
 
JS Kabylie
JS Kabylie
Association football player non-biographical articles